Events in the year 1903 in Germany.

Incumbents

National level
 Kaiser – Wilhelm II
 Chancellor – Bernhard von Bülow

State level

Kingdoms
 King of Bavaria – Otto of Bavaria
 King of Prussia – Kaiser Wilhelm II
 King of Saxony – George of Saxony
 King of Württemberg – William II of Württemberg

Grand duchies
 Grand Duke of Baden – Frederick I
 Grand Duke of Hesse – Ernest Louis
 Grand Duke of Mecklenburg-Schwerin – Frederick Francis IV
 Grand Duke of Mecklenburg-Strelitz – Frederick William
 Grand Duke of Oldenburg – Frederick Augustus II
 Grand Duke of Saxe-Weimar-Eisenach – William Ernest

Principalities
 Schaumburg-Lippe – George, Prince of Schaumburg-Lippe
 Schwarzburg-Rudolstadt – Günther Victor, Prince of Schwarzburg-Rudolstadt
 Schwarzburg-Sondershausen – Karl Günther, Prince of Schwarzburg-Sondershausen
 Principality of Lippe – Alexander, Prince of Lippe (with Ernest II, Count of Lippe-Biesterfeld as regent)
 Reuss Elder Line – Heinrich XXIV, Prince Reuss of Greiz (with Heinrich XIV, Prince Reuss Younger Line as regent)
 Reuss Younger Line – Heinrich XIV, Prince Reuss Younger Line
 Waldeck and Pyrmont – Friedrich, Prince of Waldeck and Pyrmont

Duchies
 Duke of Anhalt – Frederick I, Duke of Anhalt
 Duke of Brunswick – Prince Albert of Prussia (regent)
 Duke of Saxe-Altenburg – Ernst I, Duke of Saxe-Altenburg
 Duke of Saxe-Coburg and Gotha – Charles Edward, Duke of Saxe-Coburg and Gotha
 Duke of Saxe-Meiningen – Georg II, Duke of Saxe-Meiningen

Colonial governors
 Cameroon (Kamerun) – Jesko von Puttkamer (8th term)
 Kiaochow (Kiautschou) – Oskar von Truppel
 German East Africa (Deutsch-Ostafrika) – Gustav Adolf von Götzen
 German New Guinea (Deutsch-Neuguinea) – Albert Hahl (2nd term)
 German Samoa (Deutsch-Samoa) – Wilhelm Solf
 German South-West Africa (Deutsch-Südwestafrika) – Theodor Leutwein
 Togoland – Waldemar Horn

Events
 13 February – Venezuelan crisis. After agreeing to arbitration in Washington, Britain, Germany and Italy reach a settlement with Venezuela, resulting in the Washington Protocols. The naval blockade that began in December 1902 will be lifted, and Venezuela commit 30% of its customs duties to settling claims.
 16 June – German federal election, 1903: The Centre Party remains the largest party in the Reichstag. Shortly after the election, the National-Social Association is dissolved by its leader Friedrich Naumann, and its members join the Free-minded Union.

Undated
 German company August Storck is founded.

Births

7 January – Albrecht Haushofer, German geographer, diplomat and writer (died 1945)
18 January – Werner Hinz, German actor (died 1985)
10 February – Karl Deichgräber, classical philologist (died 1984)
24 February – Franz Burda I, German publisher (died 1986)
6 March – Franz Wessel, German judge (died 1958)
24 March – Adolf Butenandt, German chemist (died 1995)
26 April – Alex Möller, German politician (died 1985)
27 April – Karl Maron, German politician (died 1975)
8 June – Eduard Brücklmeier, German diplomat (died 1944)
10 June:
 Robert A. Stemmle, German film director and screenwriter (died 1974)
 Theo Lingen, German actor, screenwriter and film director (died 1978)
16 July – Fritz Bauer, German judge (died 1968)
22 July:
 Willi Dehnkamp, German politician (died 1985)
 Anton Saefkow, German politician (died 1944)
26 July – Kurt Mahler, German mathematician (died 1988)
31 July – Emil Hirschfeld, German athlete (died 1968)
29 August – Ernst Kreuder, German writer (died 1972)
3 August – Rudolf Wolters, German architect (died 1983)
11 September:
 Theodor W. Adorno, German philosopher (died 1969)
 Carl Joseph Leiprecht, German bishop of Roman-Catholic Church (died 1981)
11 October – Hans Söhnker, film actor (died 1981)
3 October – Werner Klingler, German film director and actor (died 1972)
5 December – Johannes Heesters, German actor (died 2011)
26 December – Herbert Albert, German conductor (died 1973)
 Date unknown – Ernst David Bergmann, German-born Israeli nuclear scientist and chemist (died 1975)

Deaths
 13 April – Moritz Lazarus, German philosopher (born 1824)
 14 June – Karl Gegenbaur, German anatomist (born 1826)
 8 August – Adolf Schiel, German-born Boer army officer (born 1858)
 4 September – Hermann Zumpe, German conductor (born 1850)
 1 November – Theodor Mommsen, German classical scholar, historian, jurist, journalist, politician, archaeologist (born 1817)

References

 
Years of the 20th century in Germany
Germany
Germany